The Test, also known as The Test: A New Era for Australia's Team in its first season, is an Australian docu-series, produced by Amazon Studios for Amazon Prime Video, and co-produced by Cricket Australia. The first season was released on Prime Video on 12 March 2020 and consists of 8 episodes. A second season, consisting of 4 episodes, was released on Prime Video on 13 January 2023.

The docu-series follows the Australian men's cricket team. The first season follows the team's path to redemption under the leadership of captain Tim Paine and head coach Justin Langer in the 18 months after the 2018 Australian ball-tampering scandal. The second season follows the team after the exit of Paine as captain and the subsequent departure of Langer during the end of 2021 and beginning of 2022.

An edited, feature-length version of the first season aired on the Seven Network on 4 October 2020.

Synopsis

Season 1
The first season is a behind-the-scenes look at the Australian men's team's fall from grace and its path to regain its integrity in the 18 months after the 2018 ball-tampering scandal.

Episode 1 
The series begins with the 2018 Australian ball-tampering scandal which rocks Australian cricket, the subsequent press conferences, and the bans from play for those found involved: captain Steve Smith, deputy David Warner, and Australian opener Cameron Bancroft. Darren Lehmann resigns as head coach, while Tim Paine replaces Smith as the new captain of the national team.

A few weeks later, former cricketer Justin Langer is announced by Cricket Australia as the new head coach. The episode ends with the promise of a better future under the leadership of Paine and Langer, who introduce an ethical code of conduct within the Australian setup as well as the gesture of shaking hands with the opposing team before the commencement of a match as a mark of respect and good sportsmanship.

Episode 2-8 
The series then shifts to an account of the next 18 months of the Australian men's team from their sole perspective. It includes their first draws against Pakistan in the United Arab Emirates, India's first test series win during the Australian summer as well as Australia's first wins against Sri Lanka, their time in India for ODI's and Twenty20 games, and the return of Smith and Warner to the team just before the 2019 Cricket World Cup in England.

The last two episodes spotlights Australia's contributions during the 2019 Ashes series, and documents Steve Smith's hit on the neck with a bouncer during the Second Test and Australia's near win in the Third Test without Smith. The season ends with Australia's retention of the Ashes urn by winning the Fourth Test.

Season 2
The second season has four episodes and follows the team during the end of 2021 and the beginning of 2022, which sees the resignation of captain Tim Paine for improper conduct off the field as well as the departure of head coach Justin Langer amongst rumours of player dissatisfaction with his leadership style. During this period the team takes on England in the 2021–22 Ashes series and travels to Pakistan for the first time in over two decades.

Cast 

 Tim Paine
 Glenn Maxwell
 Steve Smith
 David Warner
 Justin Langer
 Virat Kohli
 Marcus Harris
 Pat Cummins
 Nathan Lyon
 Marnus Labuschagne
 Jhye Richardson
 Usman Khawaja
 Brad Haddin
 Aaron Finch
 Ben Stokes
 Peter Siddle
 Travis Head
 Mitchell Marsh
 Shaun Marsh
 Graeme Hick
 Steve Waugh
 Marcus Stoinis
 Ricky Ponting
 Mitchell Starc
 Jason Behrendorff
 Peter Handscomb
 Ashton Turner
 Adam Zampa
 Adam Gilchrist
 Allan Border
 Sarfaraz Ahmed
 Cheteshwar Pujara
 Jofra Archer
 Eoin Morgan
 Joe Root
 Isa Guha
 Harsha Bhogle
 Cameron Green
 Michael Neser
 Scott Boland
 Mitchell Swepson
 Josh Inglis
 Ashton Agar
 Matthew Wade
 Babar Azam
 Andrew McDonald
 Jonathan Agnew
 Isabelle Westbury
 Peter Lalor
 Gerard Whateley
 Gideon Haigh
 Kumar Sangakkara

References

External links
 

2020 Australian television series debuts
2020s Australian documentary television series
Australian sports television series
Documentary television series about sports
Amazon Prime Video original programming
English-language television shows
Television series by Amazon Studios
Cricket on television
Cricket in Australia